Amalie Mánesová (21 January 1817, Prague - 4 July 1883, Prague) was a Czech landscape painter.

Biography 
She came from an artistic family. Her father, Antonín Mánes, brothers Josef and Quido, and uncle Václav were all painters. Although she wanted to specialize in portraits, her father believed it was inappropriate for a woman to do so and insisted that she do landscapes instead. He also gave her the only formal training she ever received. 

Much of her time was devoted to teaching her brothers. After her father's death in 1843, she took over his drawing courses; mostly patronized by wealthy aristocrats. The money earned was used to help her brothers, who were having trouble getting established in studios of their own. Impressed with Josef's talent, she accompanied him to Munich; teaching him to be more diligent and frugal.

Once there, however, he fell in love with a servant and had an illegitimate child, which left him estranged from most of his family. He was essentially ruined by the affair and had to seek refuge with a patron. When he became ill in 1866, Amalie took him to Rome for his health, then back to Prague, where she cared for him until his death in 1871. During this time, she turned down an offer of marriage from Václav Levý.

She died suddenly from heart disease. Most of her works are owned by the descendants of her pupils, although some of her work may be seen in the collections of the National Gallery in Prague.

References

External links
 
 Mánesová, Amálie @ abART
 Works by Amalie Mánesová @ Česká televize

1817 births
1883 deaths
Czech women painters
19th-century women artists
19th-century Czech painters
Artists from Prague